The Delft School is a category of mid-17th-century Dutch Golden Age painting named after its main base, Delft. It is best known for genre painting: images of domestic life, views of households, church interiors, courtyards, squares and the streets of that city. Carel Fabritius and Nicolaes Maes are seen as the originators of these localised specialties in the 1640s that were continued in the 1650s by Pieter de Hooch and Johannes Vermeer. Vermeer is the most famous of these painters today. The architectural interiors of Gerard Houckgeest, Emanuel de Witte and Hendrick Cornelisz. van Vliet are also notable contributions. Besides the genres most closely associated with Delft painters, artists in the city continued to produce still life and history paintings, portraits for patrons and the court, and decorative pieces of art that reflect more general tendencies in Dutch art of the period.

References
"The School of Delft" at Essential Vermeer
Vermeer and the Delft School (Metropolitan Museum, March 8, 2001–May 27, 2001)
Vermeer and the Delft School (same exhibition at the National Gallery, 20 June - 16 Sept 2001)
Vermeer and the Delft School, by Walter Liedtke (in collaboration with Michael C. Plomp and Axel Ruger)

Further reading

Art in Delft
Art movements in Dutch painting
Art of the Dutch Golden Age
Johannes Vermeer